The 2014 NCAA Division I men's ice hockey tournament was the national championship tournament for men's college ice hockey in the United States in 2014. The tournament involved 16 teams in single-elimination play to determine the national champion at the Division I level of the NCAA, the highest level of competition in college hockey. The tournament's Frozen Four – the semifinals and finals – was hosted by ECAC Hockey at the Wells Fargo Center in Philadelphia.

Union defeated Minnesota 7–4 to win the program's first NCAA title.

Tournament procedure

The tournament will consist of four groups of four teams in regional brackets.  The four regionals are officially named after their geographic areas.  The following are the sites for the 2014 regionals:
March 28 and 29
East Regional, Webster Bank Arena – Bridgeport, Connecticut (Hosts: Yale University and Fairfield University)
Midwest Regional, US Bank Arena – Cincinnati (Host: Miami University)
March 29 and 30
Northeast Regional, DCU Center – Worcester, Massachusetts (Host: College of the Holy Cross)
West Regional, Xcel Energy Center – Saint Paul, Minnesota (Host: University of Minnesota)
The winner of each regional will advance to the Frozen Four:
April 10 and 12
Wells Fargo Center – Philadelphia (Host: ECAC Hockey)

Qualifying teams
The at-large bids and seeding for each team in the tournament were announced on March 23. Hockey East had five teams receive a berth in the tournament, ECAC Hockey and the National Collegiate Hockey Conference (NCHC) each had three teams receive a berth, the Western Collegiate Hockey Association (WCHA) and Big Ten Conference each had two teams receive a berth, and one team from Atlantic Hockey received a berth.

Number in parentheses denotes overall seed in the tournament.

Tournament bracket

Note: * denotes overtime period(s)
All times are Eastern Daylight Time (UTC−4).

Results

West Region – Saint Paul, Minnesota

Regional semifinal

Regional Final

Northeast Region – Worcester, Massachusetts

Regional semifinal

Regional Final

East Region – Bridgeport, Connecticut

Regional semifinal

Regional Final

Midwest Region – Cincinnati

Regional semifinal

Regional Final

Frozen Four – Philadelphia

Semifinal

National Championship – Philadelphia

Record by conference

Media

Television
ESPN had US television rights to all games during the tournament. For the tenth consecutive year ESPN aired every game, beginning with the regionals, on ESPN, ESPN2, and ESPNU, and ESPN3. They also streamed them online via WatchESPN.

Broadcast Assignments
Regionals
East Regional: John Buccigross, Barry Melrose & Quint Kessenich – Bridgeport, Connecticut
Midwest Regional: Joe Beninati & Darren Eliot – Cincinnati, Ohio
Northeast Regional: Joe Davis & Billy Jaffe – Worcester, Massachusetts
West Regional: Clay Matvick & Sean Ritchlin – St. Paul, Minnesota

Frozen Four & Championship
John Buccigross, Barry Melrose, & Quint Kessenich – Philadelphia, Pennsylvania

Radio
Westwood One used exclusive radio rights to air both of the semifinal games and the national championship game, all together referred to as the "Frozen Four."
Sean Grande, Cap Raeder, & Adam Wodon

All-Tournament team

Frozen Four
G: Colin Stevens (Union)
D: Mat Bodie (Union)
D: Shayne Gostisbehere* (Union)
F: Daniel Ciampini (Union)
F: Kyle Rau (Minnesota)
F: Sam Warning (Minnesota)
* Most Outstanding Player(s)

References

Tournament
NCAA Division I men's ice hockey tournament
NCAA Division I men's ice hockey tournament
NCAA Division I men's ice hockey tournament
NCAA Division I men's ice hockey tournament
NCAA Division I men's ice hockey tournament
NCAA Division I men's ice hockey tournament
NCAA Division I men's ice hockey tournament
NCAA Division I men's ice hockey tournament
NCAA Division I men's ice hockey tournament
2010s in Cincinnati
21st century in Saint Paul, Minnesota
Ice hockey competitions in Worcester, Massachusetts
Ice hockey competitions in Philadelphia
Ice hockey competitions in Cincinnati
Ice hockey competitions in Bridgeport, Connecticut
Ice hockey competitions in Saint Paul, Minnesota